The Statue of Peace (Turkish: Barış heykeli) is a 1974 marble sculpture by Lerzan Bengisu on exhibition in İstanbul at the Taksim Gezi Park.

The sculpture that is formed out of three distinct shapes is believed to represent a mother and her two children. It is on exhibit in Taksim, Gezi Park since 1976.

References

Monuments and memorials in Istanbul
Beyoğlu
1974 sculptures
Outdoor sculptures in Turkey
Marble sculptures in Turkey
Sculptures of children
Sculptures of women in Turkey
Statues in Turkey
Peace monuments and memorials